Savoca (Sicilian: Sàvuca) is a comune (municipality) in the Province of Messina in the Italian region Sicily, located about  east of Palermo and about  southwest of Messina.

Savoca borders the following municipalities: Casalvecchio Siculo, Forza d'Agrò, Furci Siculo, Sant'Alessio Siculo, Santa Teresa di Riva.

The town, together with Forza d'Agrò, was the location for the scenes set in Corleone of Francis Ford Coppola's The Godfather (1972). Bar Vitelli in Savoca, which is still a functioning establishment, was featured in the motion picture as the place where Michael Corleone asked Apollonia's father to meet his daughter.

References

External links
 Official website

Cities and towns in Sicily